Anchal Sahu is an Indian television actress who is best known for her portrayal of grown-up Bondita in Barrister Babu and now notably as Parineet Kakkar in Parineetii.

Career
In 2021, she got her first breakthrough in television with Sony TV show Kyun Utthe Dil Chhod Aaye, where she played the lead role of Vashma Baig, a strong Muslim girl. In the same year, she played the female lead in Colors TV show Barrister Babu, where she played the role of grown-up Bondita Das, a barrister. She is currently playing the lead role of Parineet Kakkar in Colors TV show Parineetii.

Filmography

Television

Special appearances

Films

Web series

See also 
 List of Hindi television actresses
 List of Indian television actresses

References

External links 
 

Indian television actresses
Actresses in Hindi television
Indian soap opera actresses
21st-century Indian actresses
Actresses from Mumbai
Living people
Year of birth missing (living people)